Beuthen District, or Beuthen Rural District (German: Landkreis Beuthen, Polish: Powiat ziemski Bytom) was an Upper Silesian rural district with its seat in Beuthen (Polish: Bytom), which itself was a separate district - an urban district (German: Stadtkreis Beuthen, Polish: Powiat miejski Bytom).

History

In 1742 King Friedrich II of Prussia introduced Prussian administrative structures to the Silesia Province. Lands belonging to the Free State County of Bytom became a Prussian district - District of Beuthen (German: Kreis Beuthen).

In 1873 the Beuthen District was divided up: The Kattowitz, Tarnowitz and Zabrze districts were formed from parts of the district's land. In 1890 Beuthen became a stadtkreis (urban district), subsequently leaving the Beuthen District and on April 1, 1898 the town of Königshütte (Polish: Królewska Huta) split off from the Beuthen District to become its own district.

Plebiscite in Silesia
After Germany's loss in the Great War, it was decided at Versailles that a plebiscite ought be held in Upper Silesia. From 1919 to 1921, Beuthen alongside the rest of Upper Silesia entered the plebiscite era. In the Upper Silesia Plebiscite the residents of the city of Beuthen voted by a majority of 74.7% to remain in Germany. However, in the Beuthen Rural District the Polish side received 59.1% of the vote.

Following the plebiscite, the Beuthen District was divided up between Germany and Poland. Poland received the southern and eastern parts of the district from which the Świętochłowice County (Polish: Powiat świętochłowicki) was created. The city of Beuthen (with the exception of Friedenshütte) remained with Germany.

Demographics
Population of the District of Beuthen by year:

Ethnic composition
The table below presents the population structure of the Beuthen district prior to its division in 1873, according to the Prussian census information.

Jews

Czechs
A small Czech minority inhabited Upper Silesia, including the Beuthen District. In 1905 there were 253 Czechs living in Beuthen. This number however kept fluctuating up and down; by 1910 there were only 149 Czechs left in Beuthen.

Municipalities
Municipalities of the Beuthen District in 1910:

References

Sources
 Gemeindeverzeichnis Deutschland 1900 gemeindeverzeichnis.de. Retrieved October 27, 2020.
 Landkreis Beuthen-Tarnowitz www.territorial.de. Retrieved October 27, 2020.
 Wyniki plebiscytu na Górnym Śląsku. Dziewulski, Stefan. Warszawa 1922.
 Sprachliche Minderheiten im preussischen Staat. Belzyt, Leszek. Marburg 1998.

Bytom
1742 establishments in the Holy Roman Empire
1926 disestablishments in Germany
Province of Silesia
Province of Upper Silesia
Districts of Prussia